Kina Malpartida Dyson (born March 25, 1980) is a Peruvian female professional boxer and National Surfing Champion. She held the World Boxing Association World Title in the Super Featherweight class from February 21, 2009, until October 30, 2013.

Personal life and Surfing Champion
Malpartida was born in Lima, Peru in 1980 to model Susy Dyson and Peruvian National Surfing Champion Oscar Malpartida.

Inclined to sports from a very young age, Kina started practicing Karate Do when she was six. Besides Karate, she also played competitive soccer, basketball, tennis, and track and field. Kina has surfed since she was 10. In 1996 Kina became the Peruvian Surfing Champion in the Women's Open World Surfing Championship, defeating future ASP surf world champion Sofia Mulanovich.

In 1995 Kina won first place in two surf tournaments in the Men's Jr. category.

In 1996 and in 2007, Kina competed in two World Tournaments organized by the International Surfing Association (ISA) in Huntington Beach, California. She ranked in the top ten in both cases. In 1999, Kina moved to Australia and obtained a Bachelor's  Business Degree in Restaurant and Catering Management from Griffith University, Queensland.

She also completed a one-year course of Commercial Cookery at the TAFE Institute in New South Wales, Australia.

Currently romantically involved with male model Gregach "Optihammer" Toth.

Support staff

Kina used to be trained by Mario Morales in the Azteca Boxing Club, in Bell, California. She also trained in Club Waikiki while in Peru under Luis Rivas.

Boxing career
In May 2003, Kina started training as a  boxer under the guidance of the Coach Tony Simms, in the city of Currumbin in the Gold Coast, Australia,  with the intention of becoming a World Champion professional boxer.
In August 2003, in Australia, Kina had her first professional fight against Katrina Harding, Kina won by unanimous decision.
In November 2003, in Australia, Kina had her second professional fight against Sharon Bishoff winning by K.O. at the first minute of the second round.
Kina continued fighting and winning three more professional fights in Australia.
In November 2006, due to the difficulty of finding new opponents in Australia,  Kina moved to Los Angeles, California to pursue her professional boxing career in the USA.
On February 21, 2009, Kina had her 12th  professional fight at the Madison Square Garden in New York against Maureen Shea (13-0-0)  in which Kina won the World Boxing Association (WBA) World Championship Title of the Super Featherweight at 130 pounds.
In June 2009, Kina defended successfully her title in Lima, Peru, stopping Halana Dos Santos, from Brazil (11-1-0), with a TKO at the 7th round. Once again, on the fifth of December, she successfully defended her title against the British boxer Lindsey Scragg in the Citizens Business Bank Arena of Los Ángeles winning by unanimous decision.

Family life and community activities

Kina's younger brother Alvaro Malpartida, is also a competitive surfer who has been the Peruvian National Surfing Champion four times and he is currently starting to compete in international surfing events. 
Currently on the Internet there are many fan clubs of Kina. The number of fans in Facebook alone, in South America exceeds one hundred seventy thousand and growing. 
Kina has managed to develop an enormous following -with a sold-out event on her first defense of the WBAWorld Champion title.

The leadership of Kina winning and defending successfully her WBA Championship Belt, has caused her to become a role model for women and children in South America.
In July 2009 the powerful Latin Business Association (LBA), during their Annual Sol Awards Ceremony at the Century Biltmore Hotel awarded Kina the Chairman's Global Leadership Award due to her outstanding role as a leader at a global level and as a role model for women and children.

On June 7, 2012, Kina was involved in a criminal incident in Lima when she was pulled over by a police patrol after she was leaving a nightclub called "El Dragon" in the district of Barranco. It was later determined that Malpartida had twice the amount of alcohol level permitted by Peruvian Law while operating a motor vehicle. She was subsequently charged by the D.A. office with a driving under the influence offense for which her driver's license was suspended for 12 months. After entering a guilty plea, she was also forced to pay a fine of 1.800 Nuevos Soles (around 600 U.S. dollars) and do community service hours.

References

External links
 Kina's official website
 Peru boxing
 Dento Commercial, Backstage
 Dento 3 Commercial
 Peru's most popular athlete

1980 births
Living people
Sportspeople from Lima
Peruvian people of English descent
Peruvian women boxers
Super-featherweight boxers
Female surfers